Baravand or Barevand may refer to:
 Baravand, Hamadan
 Baravand-e Barishah, Kermanshah Province
 Baravand-e Olya, Kermanshah Province
 Baravand-e Sofla, Kermanshah Province